Romain Iannetta (born 27 November 1979 in Villecresnes) is a French racing driver who last competed in the GT4 European Series, driving the No. 77 Audi R8 LMS GT4 Evo for Full Motorsport. He also competes part-time in the NASCAR Whelen Euro Series as the driver of the No. 46 Chevrolet Camaro for Marko Stipp Motorsport in the EuroNASCAR PRO class.

He is the nephew of driver Alain Iannetta who participated in 24 Hours of Le Mans three times (1988, 1989 and 1990).

In parallel to his passion, Romain is an instructor at the flight school PRO'PULSION (Dreux and Issoire) and driving Ferrari 360 Modena for JMB Racing. He also worked for many auto manufacturers at the launch of new vehicles on the market (Volkswagen, Audi, Citroën, Renault, Alfa Romeo...).

It began in 2000 in the trade of automotive stunt team CINE CASCADE directed by Jean-Claude Lagnes. It revolves mainly around feature films such as: Le Boulet, Ripoux 3, San Antonio, Hush!, Taxi, 36 Quai des Orfèvres, The Bourne Identity and The Mental Love your father.

He was awarded the World Stunt Awards in the United States for the best sequence on a vehicle for the year 2003 for the film "The Bourne Identity".

Career 
2009

- 24 Hours of Le Mans 2009 with Creation-Judd/LMP1 - Creation Autosportif

2008

- Championship of Spain Supercopa SEAT León

2007

- 24 Hours of Le Mans 2007 Courage AER LMP2 - Noel Del Bello Racing 
- 8th in the Championship of Spain Supercopa SEAT León (3 podiums - 2 wins) 
- 5th in the World Cup Fun Cup (Optimum Racing - FEK)

2006

- 6th in GT2 at the 24 Hours of Le Mans Porsche 996 GT3-RSR - Ice Pol Racing Team 
- Le Mans Series in a Porsche 996 GT3-RSR - Ice Pol Racing Team (2 races) 
- Winner of World Cup Fun Cup at Jarama - Optimum Racing (FEK) 
- Andros Trophy (3 races) on Citroën C4 Silhouette - Carmine Team Competition (3 of Promotion in Val Thorens) 
- 6th Class of the 24 Hours of Barcelona Seat Leon Supercopa

2005

- Le Mans Endurance Series on Courage C65-Mecachrome - Team Noel Del Bello Racing 
- Le Mans Endurance Series on Chrysler Viper GTS-R - Paul Belmondo Racing Team 
- 24 Hours of Le Mans on Mecachrome Courage C65 - Team Noel Del Bello Racing

2004

- Spanish Championship SEAT León 
- 1 Racing Championship of French Touring Car Championship

2002

- Champion of French Formula Ford Promotion (8 wins in 9 races) 
- Vice-Champion of French Formula Ford (9 podiums in 9 races) 
- Tested by Welter Racing to participate in the 24 Hours of Le Mans and 12 Hours of Sebring 
- Tested by a team of BMW Touring Car Silhouette

2001

- Championnat de French Formula Renault 
- Winner of 4 hours of Spa Peugeot 106 
- Winner of the race Lédenon Formula Ford

2000

- 5th in the Championnat de French Formula Ford Promotion (3 podiums) 
- Participation in the European Championship and 2nd Festival POWERTOUR at Spa

1999

- 3rd in the Flying ACO Automobile Club de l'Ouest 
- Championnat de French Formula Renault Elf Campus (1 win) 
- Winner of 10 hours of Soucy Karting

1995–1998

- France Karting Championship Yamaha (15 podiums) 
- Tests in Caterham
- Flying school self ACO Le Mans 
- Championnat de France Endurance Karting

1993–1994

- Flying school E.T.A. Karting, kart course Y.D.K.

1988–1991

- Stage of motorcycle riding, participation in Jacadi Trophy

Motorsports career results

24 Hours of Le Mans Results

NASCAR
(key) (Bold – Pole position. Italics – Fastest lap. * – Most laps led. ^ – Most positions gained)

Whelen Euro Series - EuroNASCAR PRO

References

External links 

 
 

1979 births
Living people
People from Villecresnes
French racing drivers
Italian Formula Renault 1.6 drivers
Formula Ford drivers
24 Hours of Le Mans drivers
24 Hours of Daytona drivers
European Le Mans Series drivers
NASCAR drivers
Sportspeople from Val-de-Marne
Racing Engineering drivers
Status Grand Prix drivers
Starworks Motorsport drivers
24H Series drivers
GT4 European Series drivers